Charles Broad may refer to:

 Charles Broad (British Army officer) (1882–1976), British Army general
 Charles Broad (magistrate) (1828–1879), New Zealand goldfields administrator and magistrate
 Charles Harrington Broad (1872–1959), New Zealand cricketer and school teacher
 Charles Broad (Canterbury cricketer) (born 1945), New Zealand cricketer
 C. D. Broad (Charlie Dunbar Broad, 1887–1971), English epistemologist, philosopher and writer